Osage County is the name of several counties in the United States:

 Osage County, Kansas 
 Osage County, Missouri 
 Osage County, Oklahoma

It could also refer to

 August: Osage County, a play by Tracy Letts, set in the Oklahoma county
 August: Osage County (film), the film adaptation of the play